Year of Meteors is the fifth studio album by Laura Veirs, released in 2005. On August 7, 2018, it was announced that this album, along with the rest of her releases through Nonesuch would be reissued for the first time in over ten years on both compact disc and vinyl by Veirs' own record label, Raven Marching Band.

Track listing
"Fire Snakes" – 4:57
"Galaxies" – 3:35
"Secret Someones" – 5:16
"Magnetized" – 2:37
"Parisian Dream" – 3:05
"Rialto" – 4:00
"Through the Glow" – 2:42
"Cool Water" – 2:52
"Spelunking" – 3:06
"Black Gold Blues" – 3:11
"Where Gravity is Dead" – 3:40
"Lake Swimming" – 3:24
"Magnetized" (Demo version) (hidden track) – 1:39

Personnel
The Tortured Souls
Laura Veirs – vocals, guitar, keyboards
Steve Moore - piano, organs, keyboards
Karl Blau - bass, electric guitar, vocals, keyboards
Tucker Martine - drums, beats, percussion

Special guests
Eyvind Kang - viola on tracks 1,5,10
Keith Lowe - upright bass on tracks 1, 6

References

2005 albums
Laura Veirs albums
Nonesuch Records albums
Albums produced by Tucker Martine